The Groos Quarry Formation is a geologic formation in Michigan. It preserves fossils dating back to the Ordovician period.

See also

 List of fossiliferous stratigraphic units in Michigan

References
 

Ordovician Michigan
Ordovician southern paleotropical deposits